Workers, Let's Go or Heave-Ho! is a 1934 Czechoslovak comedy directed by Martin Frič. Popular actors and playwrights from Osvobozené divadlo Jiří Voskovec and Jan Werich co-wrote the screenplay and acted in the movie.

Cast
Jiří Voskovec as Filip Kornet, Shuffer
Jan Werich as Jakub Simonides
Helena Bušová as Marta
Josef Skřivan as Worst, president at cannery
Theodor Pištěk as Brown, director concern of Simonides
Zvonimir Rogoz as Director factory of Simonides
Alois Dvorský as House-keeper
Václav Trégl as Shuffer
Frantisek Černý as Shuffer
Miroslav Svoboda as Shuffer
Jan W. Speerger as Shuffer
Jan Richter as Shuffer
František Filipovský as Shuffer
Bohuš Záhorský as Shuffer

References

External links
 

1934 films
1934 comedy films
Czechoslovak black-and-white films
Films directed by Martin Frič
Czechoslovak comedy films
1930s Czech films